Mark Jones (born 4 January 1968) is an English former footballer who played as a midfielder in the Football League for Walsall, Exeter City and Hereford United during the 1980s.

References

1968 births
Living people
English footballers
Walsall F.C. players
Exeter City F.C. players
Hereford United F.C. players
Hednesford Town F.C. players
Association football midfielders